Culture speculation is the practice of engaging in or promoting an area or region through either direct investment or relocation in order to attract a pool of culture or cultured individuals.  For example, the return of a jazz club owner to New Orleans with the intent of kindling a "jazz renaissance" from the recently displaced musicians would be an example of culture speculation.

See also
 Culture
 Speculation
 Behavioral finance
 Economics

Cultural economics